Krispiña or Crispijana is a hamlet and concejo located in the municipality of Vitoria-Gasteiz, in Álava province, Basque Country, Spain.

References

External links
 

Concejos in Vitoria-Gasteiz